Atoniomyia is a genus of robber flies in the family Asilidae.

Species
Atoniomyia albifacies 
Atoniomyia ancylocera 
Atoniomyia brevistylata 
Atoniomyia duncani 
Atoniomyia fulvipes 
Atoniomyia grossa 
Atoniomyia hispidella 
Atoniomyia laterepunctata 
Atoniomyia mikii 
Atoniomyia mollis 
Atoniomyia pinguis 
Atoniomyia scalarata 
Atoniomyia setigera 
Atoniomyia viduata

References

Further reading

 
 
 

Asilidae genera
Articles created by Qbugbot